Roberto Irineu Marinho (born October 13, 1947) is a Brazilian billionaire businessman. He is the co-owner, chairman and CEO of Grupo Globo.

Early life
Roberto Irineu Marinho was born in Rio de Janeiro, RJ, the eldest son of three of the late Roberto Marinho.

Career
Following the death of Roberto Marinho in August 2003 aged 98, his three sons inherited the control of Grupo Globo, Latin America's largest media group.

According to Forbes, Marinho has an estimated net worth of $3.8 billion as of March 2017.

Personal life
Marinho is a Roman Catholic, married with four children, and lives in Rio de Janeiro.

References

1947 births
People from Rio de Janeiro (city)
Businesspeople from Rio de Janeiro (city)
Brazilian businesspeople
Brazilian Roman Catholics
Brazilian billionaires
International Emmy Directorate Award
Living people
Roberto Irineu
Grupo Globo people